Silvanus Griffiths was an Anglican priest in the 17th century.

Griffiths was born in Herefordshire and educated at Brasenose College, Oxford. He held livings at Kingsland, Hampton Bishop and Hopesay. Griffiths became treasurer of Hereford Cathedral in 1604; archdeacon of Hereford in 1606; and Dean of Hereford in 1617.

References

Deans of Hereford
Archdeacons of Hereford
17th-century English clergy
Alumni of Brasenose College, Oxford

People from Herefordshire